The 9th Louisiana Cavalry Regiment, also known as Ogden's Cavalry, was a Confederate unit in the American Civil War. The unit was commanded by Colonel Frederick Nash Ogden. Although the unit was called a cavalry regiment, it was more properly classified as a mounted infantry unit.

History

The regiment was organized in January 1865 in Mississippi, under the command of Colonel Ogden. Colonel Ogden was a veteran of the Siege of Vicksburg. During that battle, then-Major Ogden had served in the 8th Louisiana Heavy Artillery Battalion from March 29-July 3, 1863.

When this new cavalry unit was formed, Ogden received under his command three or four companies from Gober's Regiment of Mounted Infantry, three companies formerly with the 14th Confederate Cavalry Regiment, one company from his own temporary battalion, and two recently organized companies. Because of their familiarity with the countryside these two new companies, G and H, and possibly one or more of the others, operated along the lower Amite River and near the Mississippi River south of Baton Rouge, Louisiana until about April, 1865. The other companies participated in the marches and engagements of Colonel John Scott's cavalry brigade in northern and central Mississippi. In April 1865, the companies all united near Meridian, Mississippi. The unit surrendered on May 4, 1865 at Citronelle, Alabama. Most of its troops were paroled on May 12, 1865 at Gainesville, Alabama.

Companies

See also
Louisiana Civil War Confederate Units
Lists of American Civil War Regiments by State

References

Units and formations of the Confederate States Army from Louisiana
1865 establishments in Louisiana